Helmut Wendelborn (19 December 1926 – 24 October 2003) was a German politician of the Christian Democratic Union (CDU) and former member of the German Bundestag.

Life 
Wendelborn was a member of the Bundestag from 1957 to 1972, initially above the constituency of Lübeck. In 1971, in the sixth term of office, he moved into the Bundestag as successor to Gerhard Stoltenberg via the Schleswig-Holstein state list.

Literature

References

1926 births
2003 deaths
Members of the Bundestag for Schleswig-Holstein
Members of the Bundestag 1969–1972
Members of the Bundestag 1965–1969
Members of the Bundestag 1961–1965
Members of the Bundestag 1957–1961
Members of the Bundestag for the Christian Democratic Union of Germany